The Women's points race competition at the 2019 UCI Track Cycling World Championships was held on 3 March 2019.

Results
The race was started at 14:00. 100 (25 km) laps were raced with 10 sprints.

References

Women's points race
2019